Anton Möller (1563 – January 1611) was a German painter and draughtsman.

Biography
Möller was born in Königsberg. On 22 April 1578, at the age of 15, he began a seven-year apprenticeship. During this time he frequently copied works by Albrecht Dürer. Reviewing stylistic changes in his works, it is presumed that in the years 1585 - 1587 he travelled to Prussia, Germany and probably to the Netherlands. Previously suggested artistic journey to Italy (especially Venice) has no grounds.

He primarily painted allegorical, historical and biblical scenes and portraits. He also produced a number of woodcuts. He created ceiling, wall and panel paintings for town halls and churches, portraits for private clients, as well as engravings, woodcuts, and pen-and-ink drawings.

Close in time to the completion of the wing-altar of the Katharinenkirche (St Catherine's Church, Gdańsk), Möller died in Danzig (Gdańsk) in 1611. His tomb is located in Oliwa Cathedral in Gdańsk.

References

 M. Antoni: " Dehio Handbook of monuments in East and West Prussia ", Dt. Art Verl . Berlin, revision 1993.
 G. Cuny: Moller ( Moller, Miller ), Anton, the Elder .. In : Ulrich Thieme, Felix Becker, among others: general lexicon of visual artists from antiquity to the present. Volume 25, E. A. Seemann, Leipzig 1931, pp. 4–5 .
 Lionel of Donop: Möller, Anton. In: General German Biography (ADB ). Volume 22, Duncker & Humblot, Leipzig 1885, pp. 131 f
 Hermann Ehrenberg: "Anton Möller, Der Maler von Danzig (with 3 pictures)"; edition 1918.
 W. Gyssling: Anton Möller and his school (Dissertation University of Königsberg 1917)
 Choung -Hi Lee Kuhn: Möller, Anton the Elder. In: New German Biography (NDB). Volume 17, Duncker & Humblot, Berlin 1994, pp. 637 f ( digitized )
 HB Meyer: New results from A. Möller-research (research Altpr. v. 1924–1934)
 J. Puciata Pawlowska: The iconographer. Program of the missing ceiling painting by Anton Möller at City Hall to Thorn, 1959.
 A. Ulbrich: art history of East Prussia, 1932.
 Antoni Möller, malarz Gdanski przelomu XVI i XVII wieku by Teresa Labuda, Phil Diss Poznan 1991.
 About the artist Anton Möller and Joachim Behring and their work, by A. Hagen in New Prussian provincial newspapers 1847, Vol IV
 Joachim Bahlke and Arno Strohmeyer: Confessionalisation in East-Central Europe - impact of religious change in the 16th and 17th Century in government, society and culture. Stuttgart / Steiner, 1999, pp 273–274 .

1563 births
1611 deaths
16th-century German painters
German male painters
17th-century German painters
German draughtsmen
Artists from Königsberg
Artists from Gdańsk
People from the Duchy of Prussia